Animaccord Animation Studio is an international entertainment company and animation studio, which develops, produces and distributes animated brands based in Miami, Florida.

The company became recognized for its hit animated property, Masha and the Bear that currently tops most in-demand shows for preschoolers worldwide (Parrot Analytics, 2022) and holds the Guinness World Records' title as the most-watched cartoon on YouTube.

Filmography
Masha and the Bear (2009–present)

See also
History of animation
List of animated feature films

References

External links

Mass media companies established in 2008